The 2016 ToyotaCare 250 was the eighth stock car race of the 2016 NASCAR Xfinity Series season and the 30th iteration of the event. The race was held on Saturday, April 23, 2016, in Richmond, Virginia at Richmond International Raceway, a 0.75 miles (1.21 km) permanent tri-oval shaped racetrack. The race was increased from 140 laps to 149 laps, due to a NASCAR overtime finish. The first 70 laps would be split into two 35-lap heats of 20 cars. Dale Earnhardt Jr., driving for his team, JR Motorsports, would charge to the lead on the final restart, and held off Ty Dillon for his 24th career NASCAR Xfinity Series win, his first of the season, and his first win since 2010. This would also end up being his last win in the Xfinity Series. Junior would also dominate the race as well, leading 128 of the 149 laps. To fill out the podium, Elliott Sadler, driving for JR Motorsports, would finish in third, respectively.

Background 

It hosts the NASCAR Sprint Cup Series, NASCAR Xfinity Series and the NASCAR Camping World Truck Series. Known as "America's premier short track", it has formerly hosted events such as the International Race of Champions, Denny Hamlin Short Track Showdown, and the USAC sprint car series. Due to Richmond Raceway's unique "D" shape which allows drivers to reach high speeds, its racing grooves, and proclivity for contact Richmond is a favorite among NASCAR drivers and fans.

Dash 4 Cash format and eligibility 
In 2016, NASCAR would announce changes to its Dash 4 Cash format. The format would now include heat races to determine qualifiers. Each driver would qualify for heats in knockout qualifying, with odd-position drivers driving in heat #1, and even-position drivers competing in heat #2. The top two finishers of each heat would compete for the Dash 4 Cash in the main race after the heats.

Entry list 

 (R) denotes rookie driver.
 (i) denotes driver who is ineligible for series driver points.

Practice 
The lone practice session was held on Saturday, April 23, at 9:00 AM EST. The session would last for one hour and 25 minutes.

Heat #1 results 
Qualifying would be based on two different heat races, which would determine the starting lineup. Heat #1 was held on Saturday, April 23, at 12:30 PM EST. The race took 35 laps to complete. Erik Jones, driving for Joe Gibbs Racing, would dominate the race and lead every lap to win the heat and the pole for the race. Brennan Poole would complete the two drivers in the heat eligible for the Dash 4 Cash.

Heat #2 results 
Heat #2 was held on Saturday, April 23, at approximately 1:10 PM EST. The race took 35 laps to complete. Ty Dillon, driving for Richard Childress Racing, would dominate the race and lead every lap to win the outside pole. Justin Allgaier would complete the two drivers in the heat eligible for the Dash 4 Cash.

Main race lineup

Main race results

Standings after the race 

Drivers' Championship standings

Note: Only the first 12 positions are included for the driver standings.

References 

2016 NASCAR Xfinity Series
NASCAR races at Richmond Raceway
April 2016 sports events in the United States
2016 in sports in Virginia